Fur brigades were convoys of canoes and boats used to transport supplies, trading goods and furs in the North American fur trade industry. Much of it consisted of native fur trappers, most of whom were Métis, and fur traders who traveled between their home trading posts and a larger Hudson's Bay Company or Northwest Company post in order to supply the inland post with goods and supply the coastal post with furs. 

Travel was usually done on the rivers by canoe or, in certain prairie situations, by horse. For example, they might travel to Hudson Bay or James Bay from their inland home territories. This pattern was most prevalent during the early 19th century.  Canoes were eventually replaced by York boats because they were more economically and physically efficient.

Canoe
 
Fur brigades began with the need to transport furs trapped during the winter to markets where the furs could be exchanged for European trade goods. They evolved from small brigades of canoes from native villages traveling to meet fur traders at pre-selected meeting places to traders going out in canoes to meet the trappers in their home territory with forts or posts being  established along the way. 

One common fur brigade was by canoe, conducted by voyageurs or others. Downstream loads to locations such as York Factory on the Hudson Bay or to Montreal on the St. Lawrence River consisted mainly of furs. Upstream loads from York Factory and Montreal consisted of trading goods and the ammunition, traps and various other supplies needed for the next winters trapping season. These brigades were usually an annual event.

These canoe routes became part of a complex transportation system during the North American fur trade. 
Supplies, trading goods and furs were carried between the various forts and posts along the fur trade routes and the furs would be shipped every year to the world markets.

York boats

In the 1790s, York boats were created in response to the transportation problems that canoes posed. Canoes were fragile, had a limited capacity, and required large crews. York boats were the more economical option as they were durable, had a large capacity, and did not require much manpower. This allowed the Hudson's Bay Company to transport people and goods across Canada efficiently. Hudson's Bay Company administrator George Simpson kept some canoes for personal journeys, and occasionally loaned them for travel, but York boats otherwise became the dominant mode of transportation.

York boats were made by searching forests for suitable wood, floating the wood back to posts on waterways, and then sawing wood into keels, planks, stems, and gunnels. Trading posts had specific areas set aside for York boat building. York boats were similar in structure to Orkney Isles fishing boats, likely because many of the men employed by the Hudson's Bay Company were Orkneymen. These boats most often traveled in brigades, transporting supplies and trading goods.

By the 1820s, the Hudson's Bay Company had several York boat brigades traveling distinct routes. Permanent trading posts had been built at strategic sites along the main brigade routes and as soon as the waterways were free of ice the fur brigades would carry trade goods and food supplies to replenish the various trading posts along their route and pick up the accumulation of furs caught during the winter season. They also carried mail and passengers. 

The boat brigades were mostly crewed by Métis as were almost all the men employed by the Hudson's Bay Company in western Canada at the time. The York boats from Red River of the Portage La Loche brigades in 1862 were crewed by French Métis with a few Swampy Cree and Chippewa Christians. In 1862, Father Émile Petitot quoted William J. Christie then the chief factor of Fort Edmonton as saying in French; "I am myself a Métis." "We are almost all Métis in the Company. Among the chief factors there is not a single Englishman, and maybe not ten Scots with pure blood." (translation)

The crews of some of these fur brigades had nicknames, some derived from their dietary habits. The Red River "tripmen" were called the Taureaux. A "Taureau" is a bag of pemmican weighing about 90 pounds. The Portage La Loche brigade's tripmen were called the Poissons-blancs (whitefish) and the Saskatchewan River brigade  based in Fort Edmonton the Blaireaux (badgers). Les Cygnes (the swans) were from the Swan River district based in Fort Pelly, Les Rabasca (Athabascans) from the Athabasca district based in Fort Chipewyan and Les Gens de la Grande Riviere (men of the great river) from the Mackenzie River district based in Fort Simpson. The brigades were intensely rivalrous and would frequently stage fistfights between their "champions" to defend the brigade's honor.  The challenger would strut about adorned with feathers in his cap bragging about his prowess (chantant le coq).

Famous brigades 

 Portage La Loche Brigade
 York Factory Express

See also

 Hudson's Bay Brigade Trail
 Dalles des Morts
 North American fur trade

References

External links
 Canoe brigades on the Rupert River
 Manitoba Historical Society

Fur trade
Canoeing
First Nations history